Yuji Okano (born March 2, 1964) is a retired male shot putter from Japan. He set his personal best (17.65 metres) in the men's shot put event in Kuala Lumpur on 23 October 1991.

International competitions

References

1964 births
Living people
Japanese male shot putters
Asian Games competitors for Japan
Athletes (track and field) at the 1994 Asian Games
Japan Championships in Athletics winners